Hedvig Agnes Elisabeth "Coco" Moodysson (born 1970) is a Swedish creator of graphic novels and alternative comics, many of them in the autobiographical subgenre. Her works include an album collecting her work entitled Coco Platinum Total parts 1 and 2 (collected into one book by Optimal Press in 2002), The Health Center Fontanelle (with husband film director Lukas Moodysson, 2005), and Never Goodnight (2008),  an autobiographical tale of growing up in the early ’80s after punk had supposedly died and New Wave ruled. Later, Never Goodnight was adapted into her husband's 2013 film We Are the Best! In 2010 I'm Your Hell into Death appeared. She has also regularly appeared in the Swedish cultural magazine Galago.

Education 
For many years, Moodysson studied to become a sign language interpreter, but she dropped out in 1998 and began drawing comics. She attended the school for Sequential Art in Malmö in 2000 and 2001.

Publications 
During her time in school, she made the poetic and openhearted autobiographical comics 'Coco Platina Titan' parts 1 and 2, that were collected in one book by Optimal Press in 2002, an autobiographical comic book about life in your late teens. In 2005, Moodysson published the more experimental The Fontanelle Health Centre, with words by her husband Lukas Moodysson. Moodysson's comic book Aldrig Godnatt (Never Goodnight), published in 2008, was an autobiographical experiences about her experiences growing up in Stockholm. In 2010, she published I'm your hell into death, her fourth comic book about a group of hopeful fans of The Cure, waiting outside to meet band member Robert Smith.

Moodysson lives in Malmö, Sweden with her husband Lukas Moodysson (married: 1994) and their three children.

References

External links
 Optimal Press' Coco Moodysson page 
 Galago's Coco Moodysson page 

1970 births
Swedish female comics artists
Female comics writers
Living people
Swedish cartoonists
Swedish comics artists
Swedish comics writers
Swedish women cartoonists
21st-century Swedish women writers